The 2005–06 A1 Grand Prix of Nations, South Africa was an A1 Grand Prix race, held on the weekend of 29 January 2006 at a street course in Durban, South Africa. This was the only street course of the 2005–06 A1 Grand Prix season.

Report

Practice
The first practice session was wet, and the second was wetter. Both were interrupted by several red flags. Ananda Mikola driving for A1 Team Indonesia was fastest in the first session with a time of 1:28.477. Will Davison from A1 Team Australia was fastest in the second session with a time of 1:30.520.

During the third practice, on Saturday, A1 Team Pakistan driver Adam Khan was involved in a serious crash, forcing a helicopter flight to the nearest hospital for precautionary CT scans. These scans showed negative, but Khan was unable to compete in the remainder of the weekend's events, replaced by A1 Team Italy's backup driver, Enrico Toccacelo but Pakistan would not score points.

Qualifying

Sprint race

Main race

Results

Qualification 

Qualification took place on Saturday, 28 January 2006.

Sprint Race results 

The Sprint Race took place on Sunday, 29 January 2006.

Main Race results 

The Main Race took place on Sunday, 29 January 2006.

* Team France 25 seconds penalty by steward's decision.

Total Points 

 Fastest Lap: A1 Team Brazil (1'18.178 / 151.2 km/h, lap 39 of Main Race)

References

South Africa
A1 Grand Prix